Kamna Niresh Mirchandani (born 3 October 1979) is an Indian born Canadian cricketer who is the captain of the Canadian women's cricket team. She played for Canada at the 2013 ICC Women's World Twenty20 Qualifier. 

In May 2019, she was named in Canada's squad for the 2019 ICC Women's Qualifier Americas tournament against the United States. She made her WT20I debut for Canada against the United States in the Americas Qualifier on 17 May 2019.

In October 2021, she was named as the captain of the Canadian team for the 2021 ICC Women's T20 World Cup Americas Qualifier tournament in Mexico.

References

External links 
 
 Profile at CricHQ

1979 births
Living people
Cricketers from Mumbai
Canadian women cricketers
Canada women Twenty20 International cricketers
Canadian people of Indian descent
Indian emigrants to Canada
Women cricket captains